Yury Yuryevich Nedashkovsky (born 11 April 1986) is a Russian professional football player who plays for Dordoi Bishkek in the Kyrgyz Premier League.

Career 
Nedashkovsky started his professional career in the third team Dynamo Kyiv. After serving in the army, he moved to Russia, where he joined the PFL club Ocean Nakhodka. In 2011 he played for Salyut Belgorod and helped the team winning the Center zone of Russian Second Division. He continued playing in Russian third-level leagues for various clubs including Khimki and Torpedo Moscow.

In winter 2019, the defender moved to Belarus and signed a contract with the Belarusian Premier League team Slavia Mozyr. He made his debut for Slavia on March 31 in the first round match against Dynamo Minsk. In the match, Nedashkovsky was sent off in the 90th minute.

Personal life 
Nedashkovsky has a channel on YouTube  As of October 2021, it has 57 thousand subscribers and 6.7 million views.

References

External links
 
 

1986 births
Living people
Footballers from Moscow
Russian footballers
Association football midfielders
FC Dynamo-3 Kyiv players
FC Okean Nakhodka players
FC Salyut Belgorod players
FC Vityaz Podolsk players
FC Khimki players
FC Spartak Kostroma players
FC Torpedo Moscow players
FC Khimik-Arsenal players
FC Slavia Mozyr players
FC Dordoi Bishkek players
FC Rubin Yalta players
Belarusian Premier League players
Russian expatriate footballers
Expatriate footballers in Ukraine
Expatriate footballers in Belarus
Expatriate footballers in Kyrgyzstan
Ukrainian Second League players
Crimean Premier League players